Paray-Vieille-Poste is a commune in the Essonne department in Île-de-France in northern France. Paris-Orly Airport is partially located in the commune.

History

Paray-Vieille-Poste originated from the old village of Paray, which had about 60 residents in 1790. The name "Paray-Vieille-Poste"  first appeared in 1923. By 1928 the population swelled to 3,000 residents. At the time streets had not yet been built, and running water had not yet been installed. The Sarraut law of 15 March 1928 lead to the quick establishment of vital infrastructure. In 1931 Paray-Vieille-Poste received electricity and water connections, and the work was completed by 1933. The commune was affected by World War II bombings against Orly Airport.

Coat of arms

The coat of arms contains bugles of the postilions announcing their passage to tell bystanders to move out of the way, the arms of the Abbey of Saint-Germain-des-Prés, and the arms of Maréchal de Vaux.

Population

Inhabitants of Paray-Vieille-Poste are known as Paraysiens in French.

Economy
Transavia.com France has its head office in Paray Vieille Poste. OpenSkies is headquartered in Paray Vieille Poste. Prior to its re-establishment as OpenSkies, the airline L'Avion (Elysair SAS) was headquartered in that location. Kyocera Fineceramics Group has its design centre in Orlytech in Paray-Vieille-Poste.

Prior to its disestablishment, Air Inter (as Air France Europe) had its head office in the commune. AOM French Airlines had its head office in Building 363 at Orly Airport and in Paray-Vieille-Poste. After AOM and Air Liberté merged in 2001, the new airline occupied building 363.

Education

Schools in Paray-Vieille-Poste include École Maternelle Victor-Hugo, École Primaire Jules-Ferry, École Paul-Bert (Maternelle and Primaire), and Collège Pierre-de-Ronsard.  440 students attend Collège Pierre-de-Ronsard.

The Saint-Exupéry Library (Bibliothèque Saint-Exupéry) serves the village.

Gallery

See also

Communes of the Essonne department

References

External links

Official website 

Mayors of Essonne Association 

Communes of Essonne